
Kościerzyna County is a unit of territorial administration and local government (powiat) in Pomeranian Voivodeship, northern Poland. It came into being on 1 January 1999 as a result of the Polish local government reforms passed in 1998. Its borders equal approximately the borders of the old Marquessate of Berent in the German Empire.

As of 2019 its total population is 72,589, out of which the population of Kościerzyna is 23,776, and the rural population is 48,813.

Kościerzyna County on a map of the counties of Pomeranian Voivodeship

Kościerzyna County is bordered by Kartuzy County to the north, Gdańsk County and Starogard County to the east, Chojnice County to the south, and Bytów County to the west.

History
Before the First Partition of the First Polish Republic in 1772, there was a non-town Kościerzyna County Council. During the Prussian partition in 1818–1919, the Prussian district "Landkreis Berent" functioned. In the years 1920-1939 (the Second Polish Republic) and 1945-1975 (PRL) there was a Kościerzyna Land District. In the period of September 1939 - February / March 1945, the area of the county was under German occupation.

In 1920, the county granted to Poland covered the area of 117,698 ha and was smaller than its Prussian counterpart of 6,301 ha, which left for the Free City of Gdańsk (villages of Częstocin, Trzepowo, Gromadzin, Czarna Huta, Borowina, Olszanka, Sucha Huta, and Pawłowo).

Administrative division
The county is subdivided into eight gminas (one urban and seven rural). These are listed in the following table, in descending order of population.

References

 
Land counties of Pomeranian Voivodeship